Aleh Rukhlevich or Oleg Rukhlevich (born 2 July 1974 in Minsk, USSR) is a retired freestyle swimmer from Belarus, who won the bronze  medal in the men's 100 m freestyle event at the 1997 European Championships in Seville, Spain. He represented Belarus at two consecutive Summer Olympics, in Atlanta (1996) and Sydney (2000).

References
 Profile at www.sports-reference.com

1974 births
Living people
Belarusian male freestyle swimmers
Olympic swimmers of Belarus
Swimmers at the 1996 Summer Olympics
Swimmers at the 2000 Summer Olympics
European Aquatics Championships medalists in swimming